The Parliamentary Secretary for the Cabinet Office is a junior ministerial role at the Cabinet Office of the United Kingdom.

History

Responsibilities 
The office holder has the following responsibilities:

 Supporting the Minister for the Cabinet Office on cross-government delivery and implementation
 Controls (commercial, digital, property)
 Commercial models
 Cyber and resilience
 Civil Service human resources and Shared Services
 Fraud, Error, Debt and Grants
 Geospatial Commission
 Government Digital Service
 Government Security Group
 Infrastructure and Projects Authority
 Government Property
 Government Commercial Function
 Public bodies and appointments policy

References 

Ministerial offices in the United Kingdom
Cabinet Office (United Kingdom)